is a leading case relevant for English land law and English contract law on the circumstances under which actual and presumed undue influence can be argued to vitiate consent to a contract.

Facts
In eight joined appeals, homeowners had mortgaged their property to a bank. In all cases, the mortgage was securing a loan that was used by a husband for his business, while his wife had not directly benefited. The businesses had failed, and the wife had alleged that she had been under undue influence to sign the security agreement. Therefore, it was contended that the security should be void over her share of the home's equity and that because of this the house could not be repossessed. In the eighth appeal the core of the action was between the wife and her solicitor (Mr Banks); the bank was not joined as a party.

Judgment
The House of Lords held that for banks to have a valid security they must ensure that their customers have independent legal advice if they are in a couple where the loan will, based on constructive or actual knowledge (either suffices), be used solely for the benefit of one person. A bank (or its solicitor) is "put on inquiry" (fixed with constructive knowledge) that there may be the risk of undue influence or misrepresentation, if they transact for security over a domestic home, but the loan will only benefit one person and not the other. The solicitor who would give independent advice, however, could also be acting as a solicitor for the bank, or both a husband and wife (or either partner). The solicitor would certify that he or she was satisfied that both borrowers had given their fully informed and true consent, although if this ultimately turned out to be wrong, the bank's security would not be affected. Instead, the possibility of an action in professional negligence against the solicitor would arise. This would be a personal action, and so it would not help the family stay in their home. Lord Bingham gave the first judgment, remarking that the principles set down in the opinion of Lord Nicholls commanded "the unqualified support of all members of the House."

Lord Nicholls held that if the banks ensured that the wife had had independent advice, they could not be responsible for that advice being defective. The presumption is rebutted if there is ‘expression of… free will’. The idea of manifest disadvantage for presumed undue influence was rejected but replaced (like the milder tone in Allcard v Skinner) with a transaction that ‘calls for explanation’, or one which ‘is not readily explicable by the relationship between the parties.’ In the ordinary case it is not ‘to be regarded as a transaction which, failing proof to the contrary, is explicable only on the basis that it has been procured by the exercise of undue influence.’ That is because it is nothing out of the ordinary. You are put on inquiry whenever a wife offers to stand as surety for her husband’s, or a company’s debts, where the loan is only going to be for the husband’s purposes. Once on inquiry, the bank must ensure that the spouse has independent advice and a certification that they have formed a truly independent judgment.

Lord Clyde gave a short judgment, followed by Lord Hobhouse who cast doubt on the utility of class 2B, identified in O'Brien. Lord Hobhouse summarised the outcomes of each claim.

Lord Scott gave a judgment dealing extensively with the particular facts of each claim.

Significance
Outcomes differed among the eight fact patterns (cases) and three on very particular scenarios.  As such the final appeals are reported together in law reports headed Etridge (or similar) but three reports detail endorsed dissents (with criteria/tests set) in the court below or go into further detail, as endorsed by the House of Lords:
Barclays Bank plc v Coleman & Anor (2000) 3 WLR 405
Bank of Scotland v Bennett (1999) 1 FLR 1115
Kenyon-Brown v Desmond Banks & Co (2000) PNLR 266 on solicitor's advice where acting jointly - including Wilson J imposing Conditions lettered a) to i) in the Court of Appeal, accepted as correct in law in the House of Lords.

Appeals allowed
Mrs Wallace
Mrs Bennett
Mrs Harris
Mrs Moore
Desmond Banks & Co (i.e. that solicitors' firm succeeded against the borrower) 
Appeals dismissed 
Mrs Etridge
Mrs Gill
Mrs Coleman

See also

English contract law
Iniquitous pressure in English law
Lloyds Bank Ltd v Bundy [1975] QB 326
Williams v. Walker-Thomas Furniture Co. 350 F.2d 445 (C.A. D.C. 1965)

Notes

References

English unconscionability case law
English banking case law
English land case law
House of Lords cases
2001 in case law
2001 in British law
NatWest Group litigation